Romanist may refer to:
 A person who studies the history of Rome 
 A historian or archaeologist who specialises in Ancient Rome 
 A person who is a student of the Romance languages
 A Netherlandish painter painting in the Romanist style
 Romanist, a derogatory term for a Catholic
 Historically, someone perceived to be in favor of Rome Rule in Ireland, as a pejorative